TX5 may refer to:

 Sony Cyber-shot DSC-TX5 - a digital camera
 TX5 (taxi) - a taxicab (hackney carriage) manufactured by The London Taxi Company